RFFC may refer to:

 Redbridge Forest F.C.
 DTDP-4-amino-4,6-dideoxy-D-galactose acyltransferase, an enzyme